Yves Beaumier (born December 3, 1942) is a Canadian educator and former politician. Beaumier is  a three-term Member of the National Assembly of Quebec.

Background

He was born on December 3, 1942 in Trois-Rivières, Quebec and was an educator.

Member of the legislature

Beaumier was elected as a Parti Québécois candidate to the provincial legislature in the district of Nicolet in the 1981 election, against Union Nationale incumbent Serge Fontaine.

Cabinet Member

He served as Parliamentary Assistant from 1983 to 1985 and was appointed to the Cabinet in 1985, but was defeated by Liberal candidate Maurice Richard in the 1985 election.

Political comeback

He ran for a seat in the district of Champlain in the 1989, 1994 and 1998 elections and was successful on his two last attempts.  He did not run for re-election in the 2003 election.

Footnotes

1942 births
Living people
Parti Québécois MNAs
People from Trois-Rivières
21st-century Canadian politicians
Université Laval alumni